John Henry Hopkinson (died 22 October 1957) was Archdeacon of Westmorland from 1931 until 1944.

Personal life and early education 
The son of Sir Alfred Hopkinson, K.C.; nephew of John Hopkinson, the physicist and Edward Hopkinson, the electrical engineer; and brother of Austin Hopkinson, M.P., he was educated at Dulwich College and University College, Oxford. He died on 22 October 1957.

Career 
He was a Lecturer in Greek at Birmingham University then Warden of Hulme Hall, Manchester and a Lecturer in Archaeology at the University of Manchester from 1904 to 1914 before his ordination in 1914. Then he served as a Private in the RAMC during World War I. He held incumbencies at Holy Trinity Church, Colne;  Christ Church, Moss Side;  St Oswald, Burneside and Christ Church, Cockermouth. He was also Diocesan Organiser of Religious Education and Examining Chaplain to the Bishop of Carlisle from  1928 to 1944.

Notes

People educated at Dulwich College
Royal Army Medical Corps soldiers
Alumni of University College, Oxford
Academics of the University of Birmingham
Academics of the Victoria University of Manchester
Archdeacons of Westmorland
John
1957 deaths
British Army personnel of World War I